Beaver Run is a tributary of Catawissa Creek in Columbia County, Pennsylvania, in the United States. Wetlands are present in the watershed. The stream was named by Alexander McCauley in 1774.

Course

Beaver Run begins in a valley in Beaver Township, a few hundred feet from the border between Columbia County and Luzerne County. The stream flows north for a short distance before turning west, flows west and slightly south for several miles between McCauley Mountain and Buck Mountain, eventually turns northwest and then southwest less than a mile later. A short distance downstream, it turns west and crosses Pennsylvania Route 339, then reaches its confluence with Catawissa Creek.

Tributaries
While Beaver Run has no named tributaries, it has two numbered tributaries: Trib 27552 and Trib 27553.

Geography and geology

Beaver Run is a fairly slow-moving stream. It is also relatively wide in some places.

The watershed of Beaver Run is mostly or entirely on rock of the Mauch Chunk Formation. The soil in the watershed is Leck Kill soil.

Watershed
Most of the watershed is in Beaver Township, Columbia County, but a small portion extends into Luzerne County. The wetlands on the creek's upper reaches are the largest and most biologically diverse wetlands in Columbia County.

Much of the watershed of Beaver Run is in agricultural land. The stream's valley is fairly narrow and situated between Buck Mountain and McCauley Mountain.

The community of Shumans is near the stream's mouth. Main roads in its watershed are Pennsylvania Route 339, Beaver Valley Road and Mountain Shadow Lane.

History
Scotch Run was most likely named by Alexander McCauley in 1774. A legend says that he named the stream so after watching a group of beavers construct a dam on it. Beaver Township is in turn named after the stream.

In the late 1800s the Beaver Valley Post Office was near the mouth of Beaver Run.

Two bridges longer than  have been built over Beaver Run.

Biology
The wetlands of Beaver Run are listed as a "locally significant site" in the Columbia County Natural Areas Inventory. They rank in the inventory at 4 on a scale of 1 to 5, with 1 being the most important.

The wetlands of Beaver Run are a highbush blueberry / meadowsweet shrub swamp which includes trees and shrubs such as red elderberry, black ash, poison sumac, speckled alder, buttonbush, steeple-bush, and mountain holly. Other plants inhabiting these wetlands include various ferns and sedges and skunk cabbage, cattails, yellow pond lilies, smooth goldenrod, swamp candles, woolgrass, and several other plants.

A red maple / yellow birch / eastern hemlock palustrine forest is also found in the vicinity of Beaver Run, as is a buttonbush / highbush
blueberry shrub swamp. Both of these habitats contain several plants not found in the highbush blueberry / meadowsweet shrub swamp.

A number of bird species have been observed in the Beaver Run wetlands. These include common yellowthroat, gray catbird, house wren, ovenbird, swamp sparrow, and yellow warbler. A dragonfly species known as the spangled skimmer also occurs in the wetlands. Beaver Run is considered by the Pennsylvania Department of Environmental Protection to be a coldwater fishery.

See also
Long Hollow (Catawissa Creek), next tributary of Catawissa Creek going upstream
Mine Gap Run, next tributary of Catawissa Creek going downstream
List of tributaries of Catawissa Creek

References

External links
Map of the Catawissa Creek watershed

Rivers of Columbia County, Pennsylvania
Tributaries of Catawissa Creek
Rivers of Pennsylvania